Events from the year 1862 in art.

Events
 May 1–November 1 – 1862 International Exhibition held at South Kensington in London. Notable artistic displays include a large picture gallery; work shown by William Morris's decorative arts firm of Morris, Marshall, Faulkner & Company; and an exhibit from Japan influential in the development of Anglo-Japanese style. Morris designs his first wallpaper, Trellis.
 Claude Monet becomes a student of Charles Gleyre in Paris, where he meets Pierre-Auguste Renoir, Frédéric Bazille and Alfred Sisley, sharing new approaches to painting en plein air.

Awards

Works

 Paul-Jacques-Aimé Baudry – The Pearl and the Wave
 Albert Bierstadt
 The Fishing Fleet
 Guerrilla Warfare, Civil War
 Herman Wilhelm Bissen – Isted Lion (bronze)
 George Price Boyce – At Binsey, near Oxford
 William Burges - Great Bookcase
 Gustave Courbet – Femme nue couchée
 Thomas Crawford (posthumous) – Statue of Freedom (bronze for dome of United States Capitol)
 Eugène Delacroix – Ovid among the Scythians (second version)
 Augustus Egg – The Travelling Companions
 Anselm Feuerbach – Iphigenia (first version)
 William Powell Frith – The Railway Station
 Walter Greaves – Hammersmith Bridge on Boat-Race Day
 Arthur Hughes – Home from Sea (reworking of The Mother's Grave)
 Jean Auguste Dominique Ingres – The Turkish Bath (original form)
 Eastman Johnson – A Ride for Liberty – The Fugitive Slaves
 Edward Lear – Philæ and Beachy Head (pair of paintings)
 Édouard Manet
 Music in the Tuileries (National Gallery, London)
 Lola de Valence (Musée d'Orsay, Paris)
 The Old Musician
 Mlle. Victorine Meurent in the Costume of an Espada (Metropolitan Museum of Art, New York)
 The Street Singer (Museum of Fine Arts, Boston)
 Robert Braithwaite Martineau – The Last Day in the Old Home
 Jan Matejko – Stańczyk
 Jean-Louis-Ernest Meissonier – Napoleon I in 1814
 Jean-François Millet – L'homme à la houe ("The Man With the Hoe")
 William Morris – Tristram and Isoude stained glass panels
 Moritz Daniel Oppenheim – The Kidnapping of Edgardo Mortara
 Moritz von Schwind – The Honeymoon
 James Tissot – The Return of the Prodigal Son
 G. F. Watts – approximate date
 Lady Margaret Beaumont and her Daughter
 Sisters
 Edith Villiers
 James McNeill Whistler
The Last of Old Westminster
Symphony in White, No. 1: The White Girl

Births
 March 17 – Charles Laval, French painter (died 1894)
 March 24 – Frank Weston Benson, American Impressionist painter (died 1951)
 April 26 – Edmund C. Tarbell, American Impressionist painter (died 1938)
 June 14 – Herbert Dicksee, English painter (died 1942)
 July 10 – Helene Schjerfbeck, Finnish painter (died 1946)
 July 14 – Gustav Klimt, Austrian Symbolist painter (died 1918)
 July 29 – Robert Reid, American Impressionist painter (died 1928)
 August 15 – Adam Emory Albright, American painter of figures in landscapes (died 1957)
 September 12 – Carl Eytel, German American artist (died 1925)
 October 26 – Hilma af Klint, Swedish abstract painter and mystic (died 1944)
 November 25 – Katharine Adams, English bookbinder (died 1952)
 December 3 – Charles Grafly, American sculptor (died 1929)

Deaths
 January 3 – Matthew Cotes Wyatt, English painter and sculptor (born 1777)
 February 11 – Elizabeth Siddal, English Pre-Raphaelite artists' model, painter and poet, wife of Dante Gabriel Rossetti, overdose of laudanum (born 1829)
 February 15 – Heinrich Adam, German painter (born 1787)
 March 18 – Charles Bird King, American portrait artist who notably painted Native American delegates visiting Washington, D.C. (born 1785)
 March 19 – Friedrich Wilhelm Schadow, German Romantic painter (born 1789)
 May – Alexandre-François Caminade, French religious and portrait painter (born 1783)
 May 14 – Karl Joseph Brodtmann, Swiss artist, lithographer, printmaker, publisher and bookseller (born 1787)
 July 7 – Friedrich Gauermann, Austrian painter (born 1807)
 July 17 – Étienne Bouhot, French painter and art teacher (born 1780)
 August 7 – William Turner of Oxford, English topographical watercolourist (born 1789)
 August 10 – Erin Corr, Irish engraver (born 1793)
 August 28 – Albrecht Adam, German painter of battles and horses (born 1786)
 September 20 – Peter Andreas Brandt, Norwegian painter and illustrator (born 1792)
 October 29 – John Cox Dillman Engleheart, English miniaturist (born 1784)
 Undated – Jean-Pierre Montagny, French medallist and coiner (born 1789)

References

 
Years of the 19th century in art
1860s in art